Emma Lucía Larios Gaxiola (born 17 June 1954) is a Mexican politician affiliated with the PAN. As of 2014 she served as Senator of the  LXI Legislature of the Mexican Congress representing Sonora as replacement of Guillermo Padrés Elías.

References

1954 births
Living people
Politicians from Sonora
People from Hermosillo
Women members of the Senate of the Republic (Mexico)
Members of the Senate of the Republic (Mexico)
National Action Party (Mexico) politicians
21st-century Mexican politicians
21st-century Mexican women politicians
National Autonomous University of Mexico alumni